Amangeldi (Amangeldı) is a village and the administrative center of Amangeldi District in Kostanay Region of north-western Kazakhstan.

References

Populated places in Kostanay Region